The Irish Forum for International Agricultural Development (IFIAD) was established in early 2016 as a platform to share knowledge and good practices in agriculture for the benefit of international development.

The organisation has "sought to harness Ireland's knowledge in the agri-food sector for the benefit of overseas agricultural development programming and policy, and as a means of supporting Ireland’s development objectives". IFIAD was launched by then Minister of State for the Diaspora and Overseas Development Aid, Joe McHugh. It brought together representatives from the agri-food, agricultural research and the international development sectors.

Founder members included Misean Cara, Self Help Africa, Vita, Teagasc, Irish Aid, the Department of Agriculture, Food and the Marine, Concern Worldwide and Trócaire.

IFIAD's vision is to "transform the livelihoods of people living in poverty in the developing world through initiatives that support resilient sustainable agriculture, and increase food and nutrition security".

IFIAD has hosted a series of conferences to mark UN World Food Day since its inception. In 2017, its conference looked at the topic of One Health, the inter-connectivity of plant, animal, human and environmental health. Guest speaker was Delia Grace from the International Livestock Research Institute in Nairobi, Kenya.

References 

Agricultural organisations based in Ireland